Grand Tower Township is one of sixteen townships in Jackson County, Illinois, USA.  As of the 2010 census, its population was 707 and it contained 336 housing units.

Geography

A small portion of Missouri, known as Grand Tower Island, lies on the Mississippi River's eastern side adjacent to Grand Tower Township.  Partially surrounded by an oxbow lake, the island can only be accessed by water or by a road that begins and ends in Illinois.

Cities, towns, villages
 Grand Tower

Unincorporated towns
 Howardton at 
(This list is based on USGS data and may include former settlements.)

Adjacent townships
 Sand Ridge Township (north)
 Pomona Township (east)
 Fountain Bluff Township (northwest)

Cemeteries
The township contains these four cemeteries: Goodbread, Henson, Hudson and Walker Hill.

Major highways
  Illinois Route 3

Rivers
 Mississippi River

Demographics

School districts
 Murphysboro Community Unit School District 186
 Shawnee Community Unit School District 84

Political districts
 Illinois' 12th congressional district
 State House District 115
 State Senate District 58

References
 
 United States Census Bureau 2007 TIGER/Line Shapefiles
 United States National Atlas

External links
 City-Data.com
 Illinois State Archives

Townships in Jackson County, Illinois
Townships in Illinois